Kurt Pichler (8 April 1898 – January 1947) was a Swiss footballer. He competed in the men's tournament at the 1928 Summer Olympics. Pichler played 5 games for the Swiss national team.

References

1898 births
1947 deaths
Swiss men's footballers
Switzerland international footballers
Olympic footballers of Switzerland
Footballers at the 1928 Summer Olympics
Footballers from Berlin
Association football defenders
Servette FC players